The 1984 FIA European Formula 3 Championship was the tenth edition of the FIA European Formula 3 Championship. The championship consisted of 15 rounds across the continent. The season was won by Italian Ivan Capelli, with Johnny Dumfries second and Gerhard Berger in third.

Calendar

Results

Championship standings

Drivers' championship

References

External links 

1984 in motorsport
FIA European Formula 3 Championship